Gareth Edward Krause (born 30 December 1981) is a South African rugby union player. His regular position is lock or flanker.

Career

During this time, he was also included in the  Super Rugby squad for their inaugural season in the competition in 2006. He was also included in the South Africa Sevens squad for the 2004–05 South Africa IRB Sevens World Series, playing in four tournaments, as well as the 2005 Rugby World Cup Sevens.

References

1981 births
Living people
Aironi players
Border Bulldogs players
Cheetahs (rugby union) players
Griquas (rugby union) players
Rugby union flankers
Rugby union locks
Rugby union players from East London, Eastern Cape
South Africa international rugby sevens players
South African rugby union players